Robert Holme (1896–1922) was a British flying ace of World War I.

Robert Holme may also refer to:

Robert Holme (died 1433), MP for City of York
Robert Holme (died 1449), MP for Kingston upon Hull (UK Parliament constituency)

See also
Robert Holmes (disambiguation)